Cassis is a place in southern France. 

Cassis may also refer to:

People
 Ignazio Cassis (born 1961), a Swiss physician and politician
 Nancy Cassis (born 1944), an American teacher and psychologist

Places
Cassis, a suburb of Port Louis, Mauritius

Food and drink
Cassis AOC, a French Appellation d'origine contrôlée wine region
Blackcurrant (cassis)
Crème de Cassis, or Cassis liqueur, a drink made from blackcurrants

Arts and entertainment
Cassis (film), a 1950 film directed by Jerome Hill

Music
Cassis (album), a 2002 album by Yōsui Inoue
"Cassis" (song), a 2005 song by The Gazette

Technology
 Colour and Stereo Surface Imaging System (CaSSIS), an instrument on the ExoMars Trace Gas Orbiter

Other uses
Cassis (gastropod), a genus of large sea snails of family Cassidae

See also

Raisin de Cassis, or Isabella, a grape cultivar

Cassi (disambiguation)